This is a list of properties and historic districts in Arkansas that are listed on the National Register of Historic Places. There are more than 2,600 listings in the state, including at least 8 listings in each of Arkansas's 75 counties.

Numbers of properties and districts by county
The following are tallies of current listings in Arkansas on the National Register of Historic Places. These counts are based on entries in the National Register Information Database as of April 24, 2008 and new weekly listings posted since then on the National Register of Historic Places web site. There are frequent additions to the listings and occasional delistings and the counts here are not official. Also, the counts in this table exclude boundary increase and decrease listings which modify the area covered by an existing property or district and which carry a separate National Register reference number.

See also

 List of National Historic Landmarks in Arkansas
 List of bridges on the National Register of Historic Places in Arkansas

References

 
Arkansas